Heart Aerospace is a Swedish startup company developing electric aircraft. The company is developing the ES-30, a hybrid-electric, 30-passenger regional airliner. The ES-30 is planned to have a 108 nautical mile (200 kilometer) fully electric range or a 215 nmi (400 km) range when also using turbo generators powered by sustainable aviation fuel. A range of 430 nmi (800 km) could be possible if only 25 passengers are carried. Heart plans to have a proof-of-concept aircraft in 2024 and start flight tests in 2026, with an entry into service in 2028. The Garmin G3000 avionics suite will be installed with custom functions related to managing the aircraft's electrical systems.

History 
In March 2021, Heart signed a letter of intent with Finnair which would allow the airline to purchase up to 20 ES-19 aircraft. In July 2021, United Airlines announced their intention to purchase up to 200 ES-19 aircraft to be operated on United Express routes by Mesa Airlines. In September 2020, Sounds Air of New Zealand signed a letter of intent to purchase ES-19 aircraft. In September 2022, Heart Aerospace cancelled their plans for the ES-19 to focus on the ES-30, and stated their intention to convert existing ES-19 commitments to the ES-30.

In September 2022, Air Canada acquired a  equity stake in Heart as part of a purchase agreement for 30 ES-30 aircraft (under development at time of signing), which are expected to enter service in 2028. United Airlines, Sounds Air and Mesa Airlines reconfirmed their interest in the ES-30. Heart Aerospace also has letters of intent from Braathens Regional Airlines, Icelandair and SAS for a total of 96 aircraft, and an additional 40 units for lessor Rockton.

References

External links 
 Official website

de:Heart Aerospace ES-19
ru:Heart Aerospace
Aerospace companies of Sweden
Aircraft manufacturers of Sweden
Aviation companies
Aviation in Sweden
Electric aircraft
Manufacturing companies based in Gothenburg